KNSU may refer to:

KNSU (FM)
Korea National Sport University